Live at Donington is the DVD recording of the Australian rock band AC/DC‘s show at Donington Park on 17 August 1991, directed by David Mallet; it was the band's third Monsters of Rock festival. The two-hour show was performed before 72,500 spectators and included real cannons, the Hells Bell, an inflatable Rosie and two inflatable Anguses: one to the right of the stage, and one in the back of the stage during Hell Ain't a Bad Place to Be. It was filmed in 35 mm Panavision and had 26 cameras that included one situated inside a helicopter. The DVD includes special features such as stereo and 5.1 surround sound, Iso-cam versions of certain songs for different band members, and audio commentary from Angus and Malcolm Young.

Another option allows the viewer to focus on just one member for the length of a song. This option is available for Angus Young on "Thunderstruck", "Back in Black", and "Highway to Hell". The option is offered for Malcolm Young on "T.N.T.", Brian Johnson on "Whole Lotta Rosie" and Cliff Williams on "Dirty Deeds Done Dirt Cheap". For unknown reasons, this option was not available for Chris Slade. One other feature is a full catalogue discography with audio interview of all international albums.

Despite the commercial success of the DVD, many hardcore fans were disappointed that the audio was fixed, with many differences than the original video, though the DVD officially released in Brazil still has original audio. Tracks from Live at Donington on AC/DC Live have the original audio.

The audio was used for the Harmonix game AC/DC Live: Rock Band Track Pack.

Set list
"Thunderstruck"
"Shoot to Thrill"
"Back in Black"
"Hell Ain't a Bad Place to Be"
"Heatseeker"
"Fire Your Guns"
"Jailbreak"
"The Jack"
"Dirty Deeds Done Dirt Cheap"
"Moneytalks"
"Hells Bells"
"High Voltage"
"Whole Lotta Rosie"
"You Shook Me All Night Long"
"T.N.T."
"Let There Be Rock"
"Highway to Hell"
"For Those About to Rock (We Salute You)"

Personnel
Brian Johnson - lead vocals
Angus Young - lead guitar, backing vocals on "Dirty Deeds Done Dirt Cheap" and "T.N.T."
Malcolm Young - rhythm guitar, backing vocals
Cliff Williams - bass guitar, backing vocals
Chris Slade - drums, percussion

Other releases

Blu-ray
This concert was released for the first time in high-definition on Blu-ray Disc by Sony BMG on October 16, 2007. The video is in 1080p, and is a brand new 35 mm film transfer that includes a PCM 5.1 (48 kHz, 24 bit) soundtrack.

Rock Band
The concert has been released in the form of playable songs for the music video game series Rock Band under the name of AC/DC Live: Rock Band Track Pack.

The Track Pack was released on November 2, 2008. In line with other AC/DC promotions, the track pack was only available through Wal-Mart and Sam's Club in the United States.

Certifications

References

AC/DC live albums
AC/DC video albums
1991 video albums
1991 live albums
Live video albums
Films directed by David Mallet (director)